Sparta is a city in and the county seat of Monroe County, Wisconsin, United States, along the La Crosse River.  The population was 10,025 at the 2020 census.

History
Sparta is located on former Ho-Chunk territory acquired by the United States in 1837. White settlement began after the government surveyed the land in 1849 and created a crossroads by building early state roads from Prairie du Chien to Hudson in 1849 and from Portage to La Crosse in 1851. The first recorded settlers were brothers Frank and William Petit, who opened a tavern near the crossroads in 1851. Their mother, recorded only as Mrs. Petit, named the settlement after the ancient Greek city-state of Sparta. A post office has been in operation at Sparta since 1852.

In 1854, the Wisconsin Legislature named Sparta the county seat for the newly organized Monroe County. The settlement grew with the arrival of the La Crosse and Milwaukee Railroad in 1858 and the Chicago and North Western Railroad in 1873. The La Crosse River and area creeks provided water power for early sawmills and gristmills, and the town attracted a variety of small manufacturers in the late nineteenth century. Residents also promoted Sparta as a health resort after drilling artesian wells for mineral water in the 1860s. The current Monroe County Courthouse was built in Sparta in 1895, replacing an 1863 structure. 

The United States Army began to acquire land for training grounds near Sparta in 1905 and 1909. The training camp developed into Fort McCoy, named for Sparta resident Robert Bruce McCoy, and became a significant contributor to the city's economy. 

In 1967, the former route of the Chicago and North Western Railroad into Sparta was converted into the Elroy-Sparta State Trail, considered the nation's first rail trail conversion.

Geography

Climate
Sparta's location in the United States' upper midwest  gives the area a temperate, continental climate. The warmest month of the year is July, with an average high temperature of 85 °F (29 °C), with overnight low temperatures averaging 63 °F (18 °C). January is the coldest month, with high temperatures averaging 26 °F (−4 °C), with the overnight low temperatures around 6 °F (−14 °C).

Transportation
Commuter bus service towards La Crosse or Tomah is provided three times daily per direction by Scenic Mississippi Regional Transit. In addition, there is a daily intercity bus from Minneapolis to Milwaukee, which stops in Sparta. (See: List of intercity bus stops in Wisconsin)

The Sparta/Fort McCoy Airport serves general aviation for the area.

Railroad tracks owned by Canadian Pacific Railway (CPR) pass through Sparta, providing freight service.

The city is served by several major highways, including Interstate 90, Wisconsin State Highway 16, Wisconsin State Highway 21, Wisconsin State Highway 27, and Wisconsin State Highway 71.

Sparta is at one end of the Elroy-Sparta State Trail. Opened in 1967, this is considered to be the first rail trail conversion. It is a 32-mile (51 km) bike trail that was redeveloped from an abandoned railway and passes through rural scenery and three tunnels. It is part of the larger Wisconsin bike trail system operated by the state of Wisconsin. Based on this, Sparta dubs itself the "Bicycling Capital of America"; the entrance to the town is marked by an oversized sculpture of a bicyclist on an old-fashioned penny farthing high-wheel bicycle. The statue, named Ben Bikin', has been given the title of "World's Largest Bicyclist." An annual bike ride held annually in October and called the "Will to Ben" runs between the Ben Bikin statue with another from the same mold, named Will B. Rolling, which is located in Port Byron, Illinois.

Demographics

2020 census
As of the census of 2020, the population was 10,025. The racial makeup of the city was 84.5% White, 1.4% Black or African American, 1.0% Asian, 0.9% Native American, 0.2% Pacific Islander, 4.2% from other races, and 7.8% from two or more races. Ethnically, the population was 11.1% Hispanic or Latino of any race.

According  to the American Community Survey estimates for 2016-2020, the median income for a household in the city was $50,993, and the median income for a family was $70,509. Male full-time workers had a median income of $46,476 versus $32,100 for female workers. The per capita income for the city was $27,491. About 6.8% of families and 10.8% of the population were below the poverty line, including 12.8% of those under age 18 and 9.0% of those age 65 or over. Of the population age 25 and over, 91.1% were high school graduates or higher and 22.5% had a bachelor's degree or higher.

2010 census
As of the census of 2010, there were 9,522 people, 3,986 households, and 2,342 families living in the city. The racial makeup of the city was 92.2% White, 1.5% African American, 0.6% Native American, 0.5% Asian, 0.1% Pacific Islander, 3.5% from other races, and 1.6% from two or more races. Hispanic or Latino of any race were 6.8% of the population.

There were 3,986 households, of which 31.3% had children under the age of 18 living with them, 39.3% were married couples living together, 14.0% had a female householder with no husband present, 5.4% had a male householder with no wife present, and 41.2% were non-families. 33.7% of all households were made up of individuals, and 13.4% had someone living alone who was 65 years of age or older. The average household size was 2.32 and the average family size was 2.95.

The median age in the city was 36.5 years. 24.9% of residents were under the age of 18; 9.1% were between the ages of 18 and 24; 26.6% were from 25 to 44; 24.9% were from 45 to 64; and 14.6% were 65 years of age or older. The gender makeup of the city was 48.8% male and 51.2% female.

2000 census
As of the census of 2000, there were 8,648 people, 3,583 households, and 2,217 families living in the city. The population density was 1,582.2 people per square mile (610.4/km2). There were 3,733 housing units at an average density of 683.0 per square mile (263.5/km2). The racial makeup of the city was 96.97% White, 0.69% Black or African American, 0.34% Native American, 0.62% Asian, 0.05% Pacific Islander, 0.57% from other races, and 0.76% from two or more races. 1.82% of the population were Hispanic or Latino of any race.

There were 3,583 households, out of which 30.7% had children under the age of 18 living with them, 44.6% were married couples living together, 12.6% had a female householder with no husband present, and 38.1% were non-families. 31.6% of all households were made up of individuals, and 12.7% had someone living alone who was 65 years of age or older. The average household size was 2.35 and the average family size was 2.93.

In the city, the population was spread out, with 25.9% under the age of 18, 9.1% from 18 to 24, 27.6% from 25 to 44, 21.6% from 45 to 64, and 15.8% who were 65 years of age or older. The median age was 37 years. For every 100 females, there were 92.6 males. For every 100 females age 18 and over, there were 89.7 males.

Economy
Sparta is the home and international headquarters of several businesses including Century Foods International, Northern Engraving Corp., Spartek, Mathews Inc., F.A.S.T. Corp., Sparta Brush Company, McPherson Guitars, Multistack, Lake States Lumber, and Wesco Home Furnishings.

Annual events
Butterfest is an annual event in the city. Incorporated on February 14, 1984, it was formed to raise funds and conduct fund raising projects for the advancement of the general welfare of the city of Sparta. Other events include:
 Concerts in the Park
 Sound Taps Wisconsin July 4 Celebration
 Sparta Area Cancer Support Walk
 Leon Gatorfest
 Crazy Dayz
 Women's softball tournament

Notable people

 William H. Atwell, U.S. District Court Judge in Texas
 Larry Baumel, NASCAR driver
 William H. Blyton, Wisconsin politician
 Ray Boland, Secretary of the Wisconsin Department of Veterans Affairs
 George Bunn, Minnesota jurist
 David D. Cheney, Wisconsin politician
 David W. Cheney, Wisconsin politician
 Kathryn F. Clarenbach, the co-founder of NOW, the National Organization for Women
 James DeMott Condit, Wisconsin politician
 Leighton I. Davis, U.S. Air Force Lieutenant General
 Harland E. Everson, Wisconsin politician
 Robert Herman Flock, Roman Catholic bishop
 James Gillett, Governor of California
 James Handlan, Minnesota politician
 Edgar Stillman Kelley, Wisconsin classical composer
 Lawrence P. Kelly, Wisconsin politician
 Ben Lawrence, NFL player
 James R. Lyon, Wisconsin politician
 Robert Bruce McCoy, United States National Guard officer
 Milton Montgomery, Union Army general
 Joseph McKeen Morrow, Wisconsin politician
 Ivan A. Nestingen, Wisconsin politician
 Alex L. Nicol, Wisconsin politician
 Mike O'Callaghan, 23rd Governor of Nevada
 Daniel B. Priest, lawyer
 Robert Quackenbush, Wisconsin politician
 Roy W. Ranum, Minnesota politician
 Doane Robinson, born here, known for conceiving of a sculpture project in the Black Hills; Mount Rushmore
 James A. Runde, banker
 Tim Schendel, NASCAR driver
 Deke Slayton, astronaut
 Howard Teasdale, Wisconsin politician
 Mason A. Thayer, Wisconsin politician
 Eli Waste, Wisconsin politician

See also
 List of cities in Wisconsin

Notes

References

External links

 
 Sparta Chamber of Commerce
 Sanborn fire insurance maps: 1884 1889 1894 1900 1911 1922

Cities in Wisconsin
Cities in Monroe County, Wisconsin
County seats in Wisconsin